Saint-Didier (Gallo: Saent-Didier) is a commune in the Ille-et-Vilaine department in Brittany in northwestern France.

Population
Inhabitants of Saint-Didier are called déodatiens in French.

See also
Communes of the Ille-et-Vilaine department

References

External links

Mayors of Ille-et-Vilaine Association 

Communes of Ille-et-Vilaine